Okanagan—Coquihalla was a federal electoral district in the province of British Columbia, Canada, that had been represented in the House of Commons of Canada from 1997 to 2015.

Geography
The electoral district included the towns of Penticton, Merritt, Summerland, Logan Lake, West Kelowna and Peachland.

History
This riding was created in 1996 from parts of Fraser Valley East and Okanagan—Similkameen—Merritt ridings.

In 2003, it underwent slight boundary changes, with small parts added from Kamloops, Thompson and Highland Valleys and Kelowna ridings.

Members of Parliament

This riding has elected the following Members of Parliament:

Election results

See also
 List of Canadian federal electoral districts
 Past Canadian electoral districts
 Controversies in the Canadian federal election, 2011

References

 Library of Parliament Riding Profile
 Campaign expense data from Elections Canada – 2008
 Expenditures - 2004
 Expenditures – 2000
 Expenditures – 1997

Notes

External links
 Website of the Parliament of Canada
 Map of riding archived by Elections Canada

Former federal electoral districts of British Columbia
Penticton
West Kelowna